Merica undulata is a species of sea snail, a marine gastropod mollusk in the family Cancellariidae, the nutmeg snails.

Description
The size of an adult shell varies between 23 mm and 60 mm.

Distribution
This marine species is found between Southern Queensland and Western Australia.

References

External links
 Sowerby, G. B. II. (1849). Descriptions of some new species of Cancellaria in the collection of Mr. Cuming. Proceedings of the Zoological Society of London. 16: 136–138

Cancellariidae
Gastropods described in 1849